SS Darien was a refrigerated cargo ship of the United Fruit Company. Cammell Laird of Birkenhead, England built her as MV La Marea, completing her in 1924. She had been renamed Darien by 1930 and had been re-engined from diesel to steam by 1931.

The ship was owned by a United Fruit subsidiary, Balboa Shipping Co, Inc, which registered her under the Panamanian flag of convenience. She was still in service in 1945.

Building
La Marea was built as a diesel-electric motor vessel, with four four-cylinder single-acting two-stroke diesel engines. They powered electric generators that supplied current to a single electric propulsion motor rated at 981 NHP that turned  a single propeller shaft. She was equipped with both submarine signalling and wireless.

Rebuilding
By 1931 she had been converted from diesel-electric to steam turbo-electric propulsion. Her four diesel engines and four electric generators were replaced with two water-tube boilers and a single British Thomson-Houston turbo generator. The conversion reduced Dariens power output to 839 NHP.

Darien was not United Fruit's first turbo-electric ship. As early as 1921 Workman, Clark and Company of Belfast had completed SS San Benito for Balboa Shipping, again using a BT-H turbo generator and propulsion motor.

References

1924 ships
Ships built on the River Mersey
Steamships of Panama
Ships of the United Fruit Company
Turbo-electric steamships